Tilo Gutzeit (born 27 January 1938) is a German figure skater who represented West Germany in competition. He is the 1955 German national champion. He represented the United Team of Germany at the 1956 Winter Olympics, where he placed 10th, and at the 1960 Winter Olympics, where he placed 9th. He represented the club  Düsseldorfer EG in national level competition.

Originally the results of the 1955 German Championships were miscalculated. Due to this Tilo Gutzeit received only the silver medal there and 12-year-old Manfred Schnelldorfer was announced as German Champion. Several months after these championships, Werner Rittberger, who was a judge at these championships, recalculated the results. The results were corrected and the medals were physically exchanged.

Tilo Gutzeit was also a potential skating partner for pair skater Marika Kilius. She had to split from Franz Ningel due to her height. However, Marika Kilius decided for Hans-Jürgen Bäumler.

Competitive highlights

References

 Sports-reference profile
 ISU result lists
 Files of the DEU (Deutsche Eislauf Union/German figure skating association)

1938 births
German male single skaters
Living people
Figure skaters at the 1960 Winter Olympics
Figure skaters at the 1956 Winter Olympics
Olympic figure skaters of the United Team of Germany
Place of birth missing (living people)